was a Japanese actor. He won the award for best actor at the 2nd Yokohama Film Festival and at the 5th Hochi Film Award for Disciples of Hippocrates and at the 12th Yokohama Film Festival for Uchū no hōsoku. He committed suicide on March 25, 2003 by hanging himself.

Filmography

Film

Onna kyôshi (1977) - Hideo Egawa
Hitozuma shudan boko chishi jiken (1978) - Shozo Utagawa
Tenshi no harawata: Nami (1979) - Man who attacked Ryoko
Sûpâ gun redei Wani Bunsho (1979) - Makoto Katô , Robber of bank
Danchizuma nikuyoku no tousui (1979) - Shûichi Aono
Shûdôjo: Kokui no naka no uzuki (1980) - Hirohi Mitamura
Disciples of Hippocrates (1980) - Ogino, Aisaku
Slow na boogie ni shitekure (1981) - Goro
Akuryo-To (1981) - Goro Mitsuki
Kaze no uta o kike (1982) - Punk
Kugatsu no joudan kurabu bando (1982) - Moro
Kyôdan (1982) - Akihiko Numata
Ushimitsu no mura (1983) - Tsugio Inumaru
Itsuka darekaga korosareru (1984) - Kazuo Takara
Bakumatsu seishun graffiti: Ronin Sakamoto Ryoma (1986) - Shujiro Hirai
Kyabarê (1986) - Sajima
Lost in the Wilderness (1986) - Masao Ogawa
Ôidippsu no katana (1986) - Shunsuke Osako
Oedipus no yaiba (1986) - Shunsuke Osako
Wakarenu riyû (1987) - Matsunaga
Gokiburi-tachi no tasogare (1987) - Hans (voice)
Wuthering Heights (1988) - Yoshimaru
Hana no Furu Gogo (1989)
Uchū no hōsoku (1990) - Yoshiaki Masaki
Pachinko monogatari (1990)
Yamada babaa ni hanataba o (1990) - Yuji Mizuzawa
Best Guy (1990) - Major Nobuaki "Zombie/Demon" Yoshinaga
Satsujin ga ippai (1991)
Ryakudatsu ai (1991)
All Under the Moon (1993) - Konno
Shoot (1994) - Teacher Isogai
Ie naki ko (1994)
Mâkusu no yama (1995) - Higo
Endoresu warutsu (1995) - Motoharu Yoshizawa
Fuhô-taizai (1996)
Kindaichi shonen no jikembo: Shanghai ningyo densetsu (1997)
Mamotte agetai! (2000) - Shinji Tachibana
Howaitoauto (2000) - Kensuke Fujimaki

Television
The Kindaichi Case Files (1995) - Isamu Kenmochi
 Rokubanme no Sayoko (2000)
Shounen wa Tori ni Natta (2001)

References

1957 births
2003 deaths
Japanese male actors
People from Kawasaki, Kanagawa
Suicides by hanging in Japan
2003 suicides